Mauremys is a genus of turtles in the family Geoemydidae (formerly called Bataguridae).

Species include:
 Japanese pond turtle, M. japonica
 Yellow pond turtle, M. mutica
M. mutica mutica
M. mutica kami
 Vietnamese pond turtle or Annam leaf turtle, M. annamensis - formerly separated in Annamemys
 Caspian turtle or striped-neck terrapin, M. caspica
M. caspica caspica
M. caspica siebenrocki
M. caspica vetrimaculata
 Balkan pond turtle or Balkan terrapin, M. rivulata - formerly included in M. caspica
 Spanish pond turtle, M. leprosa - formerly included in M. caspica
M. leprosa leprosa
M. leprosa saharica
 Chinese broad-headed pond turtle, M. megalocephala
 Red-necked pond turtle, M. nigricans
 Chinese pond turtle, M. reevesii
 Chinese stripe-necked turtle, M. sinensis

The Fujian pond turtle, described as Mauremys iversoni, is a farm-bred hybrid, between yellow pond turtles (usually females) and the golden coin turtle or Cuora cyclornata (usually males). Similarly, the turtles described as Mauremys pritchardi are farm-bred and wild-occurring hybrids between the Chinese pond turtle and the yellow pond turtle. While it is not unusual for valid species of geoemydid turtles to arise from hybrids, this is yet to be discussed with M. pritchardi; M. iversoni is probably not, since they only seem to be produced in farms and most males are sterile.

References

 
Turtle genera
Taxa named by John Edward Gray
Taxonomy articles created by Polbot